International Fair may refer to:

Fairs 
 American International Toy Fair, Toy District of New York City
 Buenos Aires International Book Fair, Buenos Aires, Argentina
 China International Fair for Investment and Trade, a trade show in Xiamen, Fujian, China
 Cyprus International Fair
 Damascus International Fair, a trade fair in Syria
 Dar es Salaam International Trade Fair, Dar es Salaam, Tanzania
 Guadalajara International Book Fair, Guadalajara, Mexico
 HANFEXPO, Vienna, Austria
 Havana's International Book Fair, Havana, Cuba
 India International Trade Fair, New Delhi, India
 Intel International Science and Engineering Fair, a scientific research event sponsored by Intel
 International Defence Industry Fair, Turkey
 International Fair Plovdiv, a trade fair in Plovdiv, Bulgaria
 Izmir International Fair, a trade in Izmir, Turkey
 Katowice International Fair, a trade fair in Katowice, Poland
 Nuremberg International Toy Fair, Nuremberg, Germany
 Poznan International Fair, a trade fair in Poznan, Poland
 Tehran International Fair, Tehran, Iran
 Thessaloniki International Fair, Thessaloniki, Greece
 Tokyo International Anime Fair, Tokyo, Japan
 Turin International Book Fair, Turin, Italy
 World's fair, an international exposition held since the mid-19th century

Organizations 
Bureau of International Expositions
International Union of Exhibitions and Fairs, an association of exhibition centers and trade show companies from Russia, Armenia, Belarus, Moldova, Ukraine, Lithuania, Kazakhstan, United Kingdom
UFI, association of trade show organizers, fairground owners, and associations of the exhibition industry

Places 
International Fair Association Grounds, a former baseball ground in Buffalo, New York
Maltese International Trade Fair Grounds, in Ta'Qali, Malta

See also 
List of world's fairs
List of world expositions